Valent may refer to:

Valent (name)
Valence (chemistry)
Valency (linguistics)